Loafer is a 1996 Indian Bollywood masala film directed by David Dhawan and produced by Surinder Kapoor and Boney Kapoor. It stars Anil Kapoor and Juhi Chawla in pivotal roles. The film was a remake of the Tamil film Velai Kidaichuduchu.

Cast
 Anil Kapoor as Ravi Kumar
 Juhi Chawla as Kiran Mathur
 Pramod Muthu as Dhandpani
 Mukesh Rishi as Badshah
 Gulshan Grover as Krupashankar
Kulbhushan Kharbanda as Kumar, Ravi's Father
 Farida Jalal as Janki Kumar
 Shakti Kapoor as Bhiku - Ravi's Mamaji
Vikas Anand as Mathur, Kiran's Father
 Tiku Talsania as Hotel Client / School Principal
 Viju Khote as Hotel Manager
 Kunika as Flirting Woman
 Yunus Parvez as Husband of Flirting women, Kunika
 Vivek Vaswani as Pandey
 Deep Dhillon as Tatya
Chandrashekhar as Judge
 Chandrakant Gokhale as Oldster, juice seller
 Dharmesh Tiwari as Son of Juice Seller
 Anil Dhawan as Govt Officer
Ishrat Ali as Public Prosecutor, Lawyer.
 Dinesh Anand as Insp. Bhagwat

Soundtrack

References

External links
 

1990s Hindi-language films
1996 films
Films scored by Anand–Milind
Films directed by David Dhawan
Hindi remakes of Tamil films
1990s crime action films
Indian crime action films
1990s masala films